Hippocrepis ciliata is a species of annual herb in the family Fabaceae. They have a self-supporting growth form and compound, broad leaves and dry fruit. Individuals can grow to 17 cm tall.

Sources

References 

ciliata
Flora of Malta